Jeremy Scott Brown (born October 25, 1979) is an American former professional baseball catcher with the Oakland Athletics.

Career 
Brown played for Hueytown High School in Hueytown, Alabama, and went on to the University of Alabama, where he played for the Alabama Crimson Tide baseball team. At Alabama, he won the Johnny Bench Award as the nation's top collegiate catcher.

Brown was selected in the 2002 Major League Baseball Draft in the first round (35th selection overall) by the Athletics, at the behest of Billy Beane and Paul DePodesta, over the strong objections of the scouting department. He is most remembered for a minor-league game in 2002 where he, planning for a double, slipped and fell on first base, and while scrambling to get back to base, was notified that he in fact hit a home run. The home run was re-enacted in the film Moneyball.

Though spending the majority of his time with the Oakland's Double-A Midland RockHounds and Triple-A Sacramento River Cats, "Badge" (short for "Badger," a nickname for his ample body hair) had a .379 OBP over his first 4 years. Brown made his Major League debut on September 3, 2006, against the Baltimore Orioles. He had 3 hits in 10 AB, including two doubles, and a .364 OBP in the Major Leagues for the 2006 season.

Brown was designated for assignment by the Athletics on May 23, 2007 and subsequently outrighted to the minors.

On February 15, 2008, Brown announced his retirement.  Brown was the team's third-ranked catcher behind Kurt Suzuki and Rob Bowen and was unlikely to make the major league roster.

After a brief time working in the coal mines, Brown returned to college and obtained his masters in education. He previously coached at Bessemer Academy where he led his team to the State playoffs (2021), the first time in school history. Currently, Brown is preparing for his first year as the Head Baseball Coach at Grissom High School (Alabama) (2023) in Huntsville, Alabama.

References

External links

1979 births
Living people
Baseball players from Birmingham, Alabama
People from Hueytown, Alabama
American expatriate baseball players in Canada
Major League Baseball catchers
Oakland Athletics players
Vancouver Canadians players
Visalia Oaks players
Sacramento River Cats players
Midland RockHounds players
Alabama Crimson Tide baseball players
Hueytown High School alumni
https://www.cbs42.com/digital-exclusive/how-jeremy-brown-went-from-moneyball-to-the-alabama-coal-mines-and-back-to-the-baseball-diamond/